The 1972 First National Tennis Classic, also known as the Louisville WCT, was a men's tennis tournament played on outdoor clay courts at the Louisville Tennis Center in Louisville, Kentucky, United States. It was the third edition of the tournament and was held from July 24 through July 30, 1972. The tournament was part of the 1972 World Championship Tennis circuit and offered total prize money of $50,000. The singles final was won by ninth-seeded Arthur Ashe who earned $10,000 first-prize money.

Finals

Singles
 Arthur Ashe defeated  Mark Cox 6–4, 6–4

Doubles
 John Alexander /  Phil Dent defeated  Arthur Ashe /  Bob Lutz 6–4, 6–3

References

External links
International Tennis Federation (ITF) tournament details

Louisville Open
Louisville Open
First National Tennis Classic
Louisville Open